Titusville is the name of several places:

United States
Titusville, Birmingham, Alabama
Titusville, Florida
Titusville, New Jersey
Titusville, a former community in Malone (town), New York
Titusville, Pennsylvania

Canada
Titusville, New Brunswick